Richard Leach Sr. (born March 6, 1940) is an American former professional tennis player and coach. He is the father of tennis players Jon Leach and Rick Leach. Lindsay Davenport, who married Jon, is his daughter-in-law.

Leach coached the USC Trojans men's tennis team for 23 years from 1980 to 2002, leading them to the 1991, 1993 and 1994 NCAA team championships. He was twice named ITA Coach of the Year and was Pac-10 Coach of the Year on four occasions. As a player in the 1960s he had been an All-American for the Trojans and competed at the US Open.

References

External links
 
 

1940 births
Living people
American male tennis players
American tennis coaches
USC Trojans men's tennis players
USC Trojans men's tennis coaches